EASI may refer to:
Employment Agency Standards Inspectorate
Extra-amniotic saline infusion
Eczema area and severity index, an index to measure the severity of atopic dermatitis

 EASI, an Asian online food ordering and delivery platform